Tamás Deutsch (born 4 December 1969 in Budapest) is a male former backstroke swimmer from Hungary.

Swimming career
Deutsch competed in three consecutive Summer Olympics for his native country, starting in 1988. He won a bronze medal over 200 m at the 1995 FINA Short Course World Championships. Despite being of Hungarian nationality he won the ASA National British Championships 200 metres backstroke title in 1990.

He competed in the 1989 Maccabiah Games, in Israel.

References 

1969 births
Living people
Hungarian male swimmers
Male backstroke swimmers
Hungarian Jews
Jewish swimmers
Swimmers at the 1988 Summer Olympics
Swimmers at the 1992 Summer Olympics
Swimmers at the 1996 Summer Olympics
Olympic swimmers of Hungary
Swimmers from Budapest
World Aquatics Championships medalists in swimming
Medalists at the FINA World Swimming Championships (25 m)
European Aquatics Championships medalists in swimming